Elk Knob may refer to:

In geography:
 Elk Knob (California)
 Elk Knob (Garfield County, Colorado)
 Elk Knob (Gunnison County, Colorado)
 Elk Knob (Alleghany County, North Carolina)
 Elk Knob (Watauga County, North Carolina)
 Elk Knob (Pennsylvania)
 Elk Knob (South Dakota)
 Elk Knob (Lee County, Virginia)
 Elk Knob (Wise County, Virginia)
 Elk Knob (Monroe County, West Virginia)
 Elk Knob (Summers County, West Virginia)

May also refer to:
 Elk Knob State Park, a state park in North Carolina